Bibiodes is a genus of March flies (Bibionidae).

Species
B. aestivus Melander, 1912
†B. balticus Skartveit, 2009
B. femoratus Melander, 1912
B. halteralis Coquillett, 1904
†B. intermedia James, 1937
†B. nanus Skartveit, 2009
B. provincialis Skartveit & Nel, 2017
B. sinensis Yang & Luo, 1987

References

Bibionidae
Bibionomorpha genera
Taxa named by Daniel William Coquillett